Harrison Woodhull Crosby of Jamesburg, New Jersey was the first to can tomatoes commercially in 1847. He worked as the chief gardener at Lafayette College in Pennsylvania, where he commercialized the canned tomato.

Life
Born in Putnam, Connecticut in 1814, Crosby was a son of Abiel and Mary Crosby, and the husband of Charlotte (Andrews) Crosby. He died in 1892, and was interred at the Fernwood Cemetery in Jamesburg, New Jersey.

References

American food industry businesspeople
Farmers from New Jersey
Lafayette College alumni
People from Jamesburg, New Jersey
American gardeners
1814 births
1892 deaths